Morgan Park is a rural locality in the Southern Downs Region, Queensland, Australia.

History 
The locality takes its name from the former railway station named after James Morgan, who was a politician and newspaper owner.

References 

Southern Downs Region
Localities in Queensland